Emeka Esanga Mamale (21 October 1977 – 25 June 2020) was a football player from the DR Congo.

Career
At age 33, Mamale joined Matadi side TC Elima on a six-month contract.

He represented his country at the 1996, 1998 and 2000 African Cup of Nations.

He died on 25 June 2020.

References

External links
 
 
 

1977 births
2020 deaths
Association football forwards
Democratic Republic of the Congo footballers
Democratic Republic of the Congo expatriate footballers
Democratic Republic of the Congo international footballers
1996 African Cup of Nations players
1998 African Cup of Nations players
Place of death missing
2000 African Cup of Nations players
Pohang Steelers players
R. Charleroi S.C. players
Free State Stars F.C. players
Kaizer Chiefs F.C. players
Expatriate footballers in Angola
K.S.C. Lokeren Oost-Vlaanderen players
Platinum Stars F.C. players
Hapoel Acre F.C. players
K League 1 players
Belgian Pro League players
Liga Leumit players
Expatriate footballers in South Korea
Expatriate footballers in Belgium
Expatriate soccer players in South Africa
Expatriate footballers in Israel
Democratic Republic of the Congo expatriate sportspeople in South Korea
Democratic Republic of the Congo expatriate sportspeople in Belgium
Democratic Republic of the Congo expatriate sportspeople in South Africa
Democratic Republic of the Congo expatriate sportspeople in Angola
C.D. Primeiro de Agosto players
Democratic Republic of the Congo expatriate sportspeople in Israel
Daring Club Motema Pembe players
21st-century Democratic Republic of the Congo people